"Losing My Mind" is a song by Stephen Sondheim.

Losing My Mind may also refer to:
"Losing My Mind" (Grey's Anatomy), an episode of Grey's Anatomy
"Losing My Mind" (Desperate Housewives), an episode of Desperate Housewives
"Losing My Mind" (Falling in Reverse song), 2018
"Losing My Mind" (Maroon 5 song), a 2007 B-side to "Wake Up Call"
"Losing My Mind", a song by Daughtry from Break the Spell
"Losing My Mind", a song by Trina Broussard
"Losing My Mind", a song by Charlie Puth from Nine Track Mind
"Losing My Mind", a song by The Cranberries from Roses

See also
Insanity
Lose My Mind (disambiguation)